Trick or Treats is a 1982 American slasher dark comedy film directed by Gary Graver and starring Jacqueline Giroux, Peter Jason, Chris Graver, David Carradine, Carrie Snodgress, and Steve Railsback.

Plot
Malcolm O'Keefe is admitted to an asylum by his wife, Joan. After a brief struggle, Malcolm is captured and taken away by two workers. Several years later, Linda is called to babysit Joan's son Christopher on Halloween night while Joan and her new husband, Richard, attend a Halloween party. Christopher plays tricks on Linda, such as using a fake guillotine, throwing a smoke bomb at her, and using a joy buzzer.

At the asylum, Malcolm contemplates his escape after having been there for nearly four years. Malcolm manages to escape with help from another inmate and vows to get revenge on those who put him away. After Linda calls her friend Andrea to bring her film to her, Linda goes outside to look for Christopher. Malcolm enters the house in search of Joan and hides in the attic. Andrea enters the house, and Malcolm fatally stabs her, mistaking her for Joan.

Linda and Christopher go back into the house, and Brett calls Linda. After the call, Linda goes upstairs to find Christopher asleep. Linda goes downstairs, and Malcolm attacks her. She tricks Malcolm and runs outside and hides in the shed. Malcolm enters the shed and sees all his old belongings, reminiscing over them. Malcolm finds where Linda is hiding, only for her to escape again. She gets in her car, but it won’t start, and then she runs back to the house again.

Linda then barricades Christopher and herself in Christopher’s room. Unbeknownst to Linda, Malcolm burst through the other door to Christopher’s room and attacks Linda once more, this time to be fatally injured by the guillotine toy altered by Linda to become an actual one. After which, Linda goes downstairs to call the police, and Christopher takes Malcolm’s knife. The movie ends with a freeze-frame of Christopher about to stab Linda to death.

Cast
Jackelyn Giroux – Linda 
Peter Jason – Malcolm O'Keefe 
Chris Graver – Christopher O'Keefe 
David Carradine – Richard Adams 
Carrie Snodgress – Joan O'Keefe Adams 
Steve Railsback – Brett 
Jillian Kesner – Andrea 
Dan Pastorini – 1st Attendant 
Tim Rossovich – 2nd Attendant 
Paul Bartel – Bum  
Catherine E. Coulson – Nurse Reeves
John Blyth Barrymore – Mad Doctor

Critical reception 

Allmovie gave the film a negative review, writing "Genre fans generously overlook bad logic in exchange for action and overkill, but the plot holes that litter director/screenwriter Gary Graver's story are never plugged with the cheap spectacle that might have given this by-the-numbers stalker film a reason to exist."

Release
The film was released October 29, 1982 in theatres in the United States. It was later released on VHS by Vestron Video.

On November 9, 2013, the film was officially released on DVD with a limited Blu-Ray release by Code Red DVD.

References

External links 

 
 
 

1982 films
American teen horror films
1982 independent films
1980s serial killer films
1980s teen horror films
American slasher films
Halloween horror films
1980s slasher films
1980s English-language films
Films directed by Gary Graver
1980s American films